The 2016 season is Sogndal's first season back in the Tippeligaen since their relegation at the end of the 2014 season.

Squad

Out on loan

Transfers

Winter

In:

Out:

Summer

In:

Out:

Competitions

Tippeligaen

Results summary

Results by round

Results

Table

Norwegian Cup

Squad statistics

Appearances and goals

|-
|colspan="14"|Players away from Strømsgodset on loan:

|-
|colspan="14"|Players who appeared for Strømsgodset no longer at the club:

|}

Goal scorers

Disciplinary record

References

Sogndal Fotball seasons
Sogndal